Neorastia is a monotypic snout moth genus described by Hans Georg Amsel in 1954. Its only species, described in the same publication, Neorastia albicostella, is known from Iran (including Bender Tchahbahar, the type location).

References

Taxa named by Hans Georg Amsel
Anerastiini
Monotypic moth genera
Moths of Asia
Pyralidae genera